Camunda Platform is a free and open workflow and decision automation platform. Camunda Platform ships with tools for creating workflow and decision models, operating deployed models in production, and allowing users to execute workflow tasks assigned to them. It is developed in Java and released as source-available software; the Desktop Modeler is licensed under the MIT License, other components under proprietary licenses.

Camunda is based in Berlin with offices in San Francisco and Denver, USA.

It provides a Business Process Model and Notation (BPMN) standard compliant workflow engine and a Decision Model and Notation (DMN) standard compliant decision engine, which can be embedded in Java applications and with other languages via REST.

History
Camunda was founded by Jakob Freund and Bernd Rücker in 2008 as a business process management (BPM) consulting company. Over the next four years, Camunda built a consulting customer base of more than 250.

On 18 March 2013, Camunda forked the Activiti project to launch Camunda BPM as an open-source project.

In 2017 and 2018, Camunda was named in Deloitte Technology Fast 500 EMEA. and in 2019 and 2020 was listed in Deloitte's Technology Fast 50 Germany.

In December 2018, Camunda raised 25 million in series A funding from Highland Europe.

In March 2021, Camunda raised 82 million in a series B funding round led by Insight Partners, along with series A investors Highland Europe.

Architecture
Camunda Platform is a lightweight, Java-based framework. It can be used as a standalone process engine server or embedded inside custom Java applications. It offers non-Java developers a REST API and dedicated client libraries to build applications connecting to a remote workflow engine.

Features

The Camunda Modeler desktop application allows developers to create and edit BPMN process diagrams and DMN decision tables. Created files are deployed in the Camunda Engines, which use a BPMN parser to transform BPMN 2.0 XML files, and DMN XML files, into Java Objects, and implements BPMN 2.0 constructs with a set of BPMN Behavior implementations.

Typical use cases for the Camunda BPMN Workflow Engine can be microservices orchestration and human task management.

The Camunda DMN Decision Engine executes business-driven decision tables. It is pre-integrated with the Workflow Engine but can be used as a stand-alone application via REST or inside Java applications.

Camunda’s additional web applications provide the following tools for developers and business users:

 Cockpit: A tool for technical process operations enabling users to monitor workflows and decisions in production, to analyze and solve technical problems.

 Tasklist: Allows end users to work on assigned tasks and provides additional visibility when using the Camunda Workflow Engine for human task management.

 Optimize: An analytics and reporting tool to identify errors and bottlenecks in workflow processes.

 Cawemo: A collaborative modeling tool allowing multiple users to create, edit and specify BPMN process diagrams. The tool was originally a standalone web app created by Camunda developers and was brought into the main product stack in May 2019.

 Admin: Allows users to manage Camunda web applications or REST API users. Existing user management can be integrated via LDAP.

Clients
Camunda has been deployed in companies such as True Engineering, 24 Hour Fitness, Royal Bank of Scotland, Lufthansa Technik, Zalando, NASA, Universal Music, AXA Insurance, Intuit, T-Mobile, Kühne + Nagel, Sparebank1 and Generali.

References

External links
 Official website
 JAXenter Innovation Awards 2016

Workflow applications
Cross-platform free software
Free software programmed in Java (programming language)
Free business software
2013 software